Davao City National High School, known locally as "City High", is the largest public school in Davao City and one of the largest in the Davao Region, Philippines with more than 12,000 students in 150 sections. It has 400 teachers and 60 administrative and non-teaching staff members. Davao City National High School has been referred to as the premier public secondary school in Davao Region.

Ang Davao City National High School, na lokal na kilala bilang "City High", ay ang pinakamalaking pampublikong paaralan sa Lungsod ng Davao at isa sa pinakamalaki sa Rehiyon ng Davao, Pilipinas na mayroong higit sa 12,000 mga mag-aaral sa 150 seksyon. Mayroon itong 400 guro at 60 miyembro ng administratibo at Hindi nagtuturo. Ang Davao City National High School ay tinukoy bilang premier na pampublikong sekundaryong paaralan sa Rehiyon ng Davao.

History 
The Davao City National High School, first known as the Davao Provincial High School had its humble beginning in 1922. Housed in a Nipa hut at Magallanes Street, it opened its doors to 67 eager students with Mr. Dominador Fernandez as Officer-in-Charge and later by Mr. Adolfo Casolan as Principal with three teachers to help him guide the sixty seven (67) students who were enrolled at the time.

When the municipality of Davao became a chartered city by virtue of Commonwealth Act No. 51, series of 1937, the name of school was fittingly changed to Davao City High School.

To accommodate the increasing enrollment, a building was constructed at its present site in 1941. Unfortunately, this building was completely demolished by American bombs in April 1945.

After liberation, classes were resumed temporarily at the Chavez Building at Claveria Street but later in March 1946, the school moved to a more spacious site at Villa-Abrille Street. In 1950, Davao City High School finally transferred to its present site along Florentino Torres Street with the area of 62,657 square meters. The spacious site was donated by the Tionko Family.

With the Nationalization of all Secondary Schools in the country, the school is now called Davao City National High School. Today, it is on its 97 years of existence, it has acquired 36 buildings, an Auditorium, School Library, Learning Centers, Rizal Shrine, Heroes Tree Park and several mini-gardens, Covered pathways, and new comfort room are among the added improvements in the school. The population has soared to more than 800,000 students in 500 sections. Ithas 1000 teachers and 100 administrative and non-teaching staff members.

References

External links
 Davao City National High School official website

High schools in the Philippines
Schools in Davao City
Educational institutions established in 1922
1922 establishments in the Philippines